Frederick A. Poth Houses is a set of four historic homes located in the Powelton Village neighborhood of Philadelphia, Pennsylvania. They were built in 1890, and consist of three double houses and a half double.  The buildings are built of brick, with limestone trim and mansard roofs in the German Gothic-style. They feature elaborately decorated dormers, balcony-like projections, and spidery porches.

It was added to the National Register of Historic Places in 1979.

References

Residential buildings on the National Register of Historic Places in Philadelphia
Gothic Revival architecture in Pennsylvania
Residential buildings completed in 1890
Powelton Village, Philadelphia